Roberto Casuso (24 October 1954 – 29 November 2011) was a Cuban handball player. He competed in the men's tournament at the 1980 Summer Olympics.

References

1954 births
2011 deaths
Cuban male handball players
Olympic handball players of Cuba
Handball players at the 1980 Summer Olympics
Sportspeople from Havana
20th-century Cuban people